Armand Vetulani (16 December 1909 – 3 April 1994) was a Polish art historian and educator, first director of the Central Bureau for Art Exhibitions.

Biography 
He was the son of Eugeniusz Vetulani, brother of Zbigniew and Eugeniusz "Gajga" (an Auschwitz prisoner). During the German occupation of Poland he was an underground educator, which was constantly threatened by the death penalty. Joanna Kulmowa remembered him from that period as a "wonderful teacher". In her 1971 novel Trzy (Three) Kulmowa introduced a character called Dorian whose prototype was Vetulani.

In Interwar period Vetulani worked in the Fine Arts Section of Ministry of Religious Denominations and Public Education in Warsaw – see picture below.

After the end of the war Vetulani worked as an artistic director at the Silk Factory in Milanówek. Since 1949 he was the director of Central Bureau for Art Exhibitions, newly opened, central national art institution settled in Warsaw. He was stripped of his office in 1954, after refusing to sign up to the Polish United Workers' Party, according to Vetulani's long-time collaborator and friend, Bożena Kowalska. In 1952 he received Gold Cross of Merit.

Since 1953 he taught at the State Visual Arts Gathering in Grodzisk Mazowiecki, an institution led by a painter Edward Kokoszko. Since 1954 until 1955 he was a Head of Documentation of Contemporary Visual Arts Department at The Institute of Art of the Polish Academy of Sciences.

He was an author of several works on art history, including a monograph on Wojciech Gerson (1952) and a chapter on realistic painting in the book A History of Polish Art (Dzieje sztuki polskiej, 1984) edited by Bożena Kowalska.

For many years he remained a single. In the late years he married his long-time friend and secretary Barbara. They didn't have children.

Gallery

References

Polish art historians
1909 births
1994 deaths
Writers from Warsaw
Polish people of Italian descent
Place of birth missing